In lattice field theory, domain wall (DW) fermions are a fermion discretization avoiding the fermion doubling problem. They are a realisation of Ginsparg–Wilson fermions in the infinite separation limit  where they become equivalent to overlap fermions. DW fermions have undergone numerous improvements since Kaplan's original formulation such as the reinterpretation by Shamir and the generalisation to Möbius DW fermions by Brower, Neff and Orginos.

The original -dimensional Euclidean spacetime is lifted into  dimensions. The additional dimension of length  has open boundary conditions and the so-called domain walls form its boundaries. The physics is now found to ″live″ on the domain walls and the doublers are located on opposite walls, that is at  they completely decouple from the system.

Kaplan's (and equivalently Shamir's) DW Dirac operator is defined by two addends

with

	
DW fermions do not contradict the Nielsen–Ninomiya theorem because they explicitly violate chiral symmetry (asymptotically obeying the Ginsparg–Wilson equation).

References 

Lattice field theory
Fermions